Pinegrove is an unincorporated locality on BC Highway 26 in the Cariboo Country of the Central Interior of British Columbia, located between Coldspring House (SW) and Beaver Pass House (NE), southwest of Four Mile Lake.  It is the location of the Troll Ski Resort.

See also
Wells, British Columbia
Barkerville, British Columbia

References

Unincorporated settlements in British Columbia
Populated places in the Cariboo Regional District
Geography of the Cariboo